The Kłodnica is a river in Upper Silesia, southern Poland.

Kłodnica may also refer to:
Kłodnica, Lublin Voivodeship, a village in east Poland
Kłodnica, Lubusz Voivodeship, a village in west Poland
Kłodnica, Opole Voivodeship, a district of the city Kędzierzyn-Koźle